The Motions were a Dutch band from The Hague founded in 1964 and active until 1970. The lead singer was Rudy Bennett, with Robbie van Leeuwen on guitar, Henk Smitskamp on bass guitar, and Sieb Warner on drums. They were the first Nederbeat band to achieve chart success.

Their single "Wasted Words" was their first major hit in the Netherlands in 1965. Other songs include "Why Don't You Take It", "There's No Place to Hide", "Every Step I Take" and "It's The Same Old Song".

Guitar player Robbie van Leeuwen went on to achieve international success as a founder of Shocking Blue, with their song "Venus" in particular.

Rudy Bennett also released successful records. He had solo hit with in 1967 with "How Can We Hang On to a Dream", another charted song with Galaxy-Lin in he mid-1970s, and then further success as the duo Bennet & Bee later in the early 1980s.

Discography

Albums
1965 - Introduction to The Motions - HAVOC HJH 2
1966 - Their Own Way - HAVOC IHLP 2
1967 - Greatest Hits - HAVOC HJH 136
1967 - Motions Songbook - TEENBEAT APLP 101
1967 - Impressions of Wonderful - HAVOC HALP 021
1968 - The Motions Live! (Studio recordings with added applause) - MARBLE ARCH MALH 201
1969 - Electric Baby - DECCA DU 170 023
1970 - Sensation - SIMOGRAM 00502
1973 - Terug in de Tijd - NEGRAM HJN 205
1979 - Golden Greats of The Motions - NEGRAM 5N 028 26153
1989 - The Original Hit Recordings and More - EMI 791 943 2
1992 - Wasted Words - DGR 6001
1993 - Impressions of Wonderful 1965-1967 (Original studio-tracks, alternates & unreleased takes!) - PSEUDONYM CDP 1004 DD
2001 - Introduction to The Motions + Their Own Way (+7) - PSEUDONYM CDP 1084 DD
2002 - Singles A's & B's (2 CDs) - HUNTER MUSIC HM 1386 2

Singles
1965 - "It's Gone" / "I've Got Misery" - HAVOC SH 105
1965 - "You Bother Me" / "We Fell in Love" - HAVOC SH 107
1965 - "For Another Man" / "I've Waited So Long" - HAVOC SH 108
1965 - "Love Won't Stop" / "No Matter Where You Run" - HAVOC SH 110
1965 - "Wasted Words" / "I'll Follow the Sun" - HAVOC SH 111
1965 - "I've Waited So Long" + "It's Gone" / "For Another Man" + "I've Got Misery" - VOGUE INT 18017 (Frankrijk)
1966 - "Everything That's Mine" / "There's No Place to Hide" - HAVOC SH 114
1966 - "Why Don't You Take It?" / "My Love Is Growing" - HAVOC SH 116
1966 - "Every Step I Take" / "Stop Your Crying" - HAVOC SH 121
1966 - "It's the Same Old Song" / "Someday Child" - HAVOC SH 122
1966 - "Wasted Words" + "I'll Follow the Sun" / "There's No Place to Hide" + "Everything That's Mine" (7" EP) - VOGUE INT 18069 (Frankrijk)
1966 - "Every Step I Take" + "Hard Time Blues" / "Stop Your Crying" + "Everything That's Mine"	(7" EP) - VOGUE INT 18097 (Frankrijk)
1967 - "I Want You, I Need You" / "Suzie Baby" - HAVOC SH 130
1967 - "Wonderful Impressions" / "Nellie the Horse" - HAVOC SH 137
1967 - "Tonight We'll Be Stoned" / "One Million Red Balloons" - HAVOC SH 139
1968 - "You're My Adee" / "Hey Conductor Man" - HAVOC SH 142
1968 - "Take Your Time" / "Make It Legal" - HAVOC SH 146
1968 - "Miracle Man" / "Something" - DECCA AT 10 327
1968 - "I Ain't Got Time" / "Fantasy Club" - DECCA AT 10 337
1968 - "What's Your Name" / "Little Boy's Life" + "Illusion" - DECCA AT 10 358 (Never released)
1968 - "Take the Fast Train" / "Hamburg City" - DECCA AT 10 361
1969 - "It's Alright" / "Hey Everybody" - DECCA AT 10 374
1969 - "Freedom" / "Little Boy's Life" + "What's Your Name" - DECCA AT 10 382
1969 - "Eliza" / "Wedding of the Hundred Brides" - DECCA AT 10 396
1969 - "I Can't Help It" / "Look Away" - DECCA	AT 10 405
1970 - "Try to Make You Happy" / "We All Come Together" - NEGRAM NG 195
1972 - "Wasted Words" / "It's the Same Old Song" + "My Love Is Growing" (7" EP) - NEGRAM NG 292
1981 - "Wasted Words" / "It's the Same Old Song" - NEGRAM 5C 006 26700

References

Dutch musical groups